AN AMERICAN  GIRL: The Self-Destruction of Gia is a 2003 documentary film about model Gia Carangi and her untimely death. It was directed and produced by J.J. Martin and CINE L'MOD.

Overview
In AN AMERICAN GIRL: The Self-Destruction of Gia, filmmaker JJ Martin explores Gia Carangi's life through rare home movies and photos, previously unseen interviews with Gia, and contemporary interviews with family, friends, and associates. Fashion photographer and friend Francesco Scavullo and designers Diane von Fürstenberg and Vera Wang describe Carangi's special spark, and the arc of her modeling career.

The life of Gia Carangi, who through her addiction to heroin contracted, and died of AIDS in 1986 at the age of 26, was also the subject of the HBO-produced docudrama Gia, starring Angelina Jolie.

AN AMERICAN GIRL: The Self-Destruction of Gia was shown at the 2003 Tribeca Film Festival.

References

External links 
 
 

2003 films
American documentary films
Documentary films about drug addiction
Documentary films about HIV/AIDS
2000s English-language films
HIV/AIDS in American films
2000s American films